The Eparchy of New Westminster is a Ukrainian Greek Catholic Church ecclesiastical territory or eparchy of the Catholic Church in the Canadian province of British Columbia. The eparchy is a suffragan in the ecclesiastical province of the metropolitan Archeparchy of Winnipeg.

, the diocese contained 7,800 Catholics with 17 parishes, 11 active diocesan priests and 2 religious priests as well as 2 women religious, 2 religious brothers, and 2 permanent deacons. On 16 January 2020, bishop David Motiuk was appointed an Apostolic Administrator of the Eparchy of New Westminster.

Eparchial bishops
The following is a list of the bishops and archbishops and their terms of service:
 Jeronim Chimy (1974–1992)
 Severian Yakymyshyn (1995–2007)
 Kenneth Nowakowski (2007–2020)
 David Motiuk, Apostolic Administrator (since 2020)

References

 Eparchy of New Westminster page at catholichierarchy.org retrieved July 14, 2006

External links
 

1974 establishments in British Columbia
New Westminster
New Westminster
Ukrainian Catholic Church in Canada
New Westminster
New Westminster, Ukrainian Catholic Eparchy of